San Matías Tlalancaleca is a town and municipality in Puebla in south-eastern Mexico. The population of San Matias Tlalancaleca was 20,974 inhabitants in 2015.

References

Municipalities of Puebla